is a former Japanese football player. He played for Japan national team.

Club career
Kubo was born in Chikuzen, Fukuoka on June 18, 1976. After graduating from high school, he joined Sanfrecce Hiroshima in 1995. He debuted in 1996 and became a regular striker as Takuya Takagi successor from 1998. However the club was relegated to J2 League in 2002. He moved to Yokohama F. Marinos in 2003. In 2003, the club won the champions J1 League. He was also selected Best Eleven and Japanese Footballer of the Year awards. However his opportunity to play decreased for low back pain from 2004. He moved to Yokohama FC in 2007. However the club was relegated to J2 League and he also did not play many matches. After that, he returned to Sanfrecce Hiroshima in 2008 and moved to Zweigen Kanazawa in 2010. He retired end of 2011 season.

National team career
After 1998 World Cup, in October 1998, Kubo was selected Japan national team by new manager Philippe Troussier. On October 28, he debuted for Japan against Egypt. Although he played at 2000 Asian Cup and 2001 Confederations Cup, his opportunity to play in the matches was few and he was not selected Japan for 2002 World Cup. After 2002 World Cup, in December 2003, he was selected Japan for 2003 East Asian Football Championship and he scored 2 goals against China. This goals were his first goal for Japan. In the first half of 2004, he played as striker and scored 6 goals in 9 games. However, he did not play for low back pain from late 2004. From February 2006, he came back to Japan and he scored 3 goals in 6 matches, however he was not selected Japan for 2006 World Cup. He played 32 games and scored 11 goals for Japan until 2006.

Club statistics

National team statistics

National team career statistics

Appearances in major competitions

National team goals

Honors and awards

Individual
 Japanese Footballer of the Year: 2003
 J.League Best Eleven: 2003
 East Asian Football Championship Top Scorer: 2003

Team Honors
  Yokohama F. Marinos
 J1 League: 2003, 2004
 Japanese Super Cup: 2008

References

External links

Japan National Football Team Database

1976 births
Living people
Association football people from Fukuoka Prefecture
Japanese footballers
Japan international footballers
J1 League players
J2 League players
Japan Football League players
Sanfrecce Hiroshima players
Yokohama F. Marinos players
Yokohama FC players
Zweigen Kanazawa players
2000 AFC Asian Cup players
2001 FIFA Confederations Cup players
AFC Asian Cup-winning players
Association football forwards